The Magic Fish is a semi-autobiographical graphic novel written and illustrated by Trung Le Nguyen. The novel tells the story of Tiến Phong, a second generation American Vietnamese teenager, who helps his mother learn English through fairy tales while struggling to tell her about his sexuality.

Nguyen's debut graphic novel was published in 2020 by Random House Graphic, an imprint of Penguin Random House. Nguyen was nominated for an Eisner Award for his work, and the book was shortlisted for the British Fantasy Award, GLAAD Media Award and Lambda Literary Award.

Style 
One aspect noted by reviewers in Trung Le Nguyen's graphic novel is the use of different colors to "distinguish each story line." Kirkus Reviews called it "a road map for readers", with the three colors being used to highlight whether the current panel is "set in the present, the past, or within the fairy tale." Nguyen uses the color red for panels in the present, yellow for those in the past, and purple for panels representing fairy tales, filling the panels with those colors.

Background 

The story told in The Magic Fish is partially based on the author's life. Nguyen was born in a refugee camp and moved to the United States with his parents, where they learned English together, which included reading fairy tales. Throughout Nguyen's graphic novel, three fairy tales are shared by the main characters. The first two tales told in The Magic Fish are "Cinderella" stories, and were chosen by the author to highlight the different backgrounds of the son and mother characters. The third fairy tale is Hans Christian Andersen's "The Little Mermaid".

Reception 
The Magic Fish received a starred review from Kirkus Reviews, which noted Trung Le Nguyen's skill at mixing Vietnamese and Westerns fairy tales in his story, while connecting that to the main character's "struggle over coming out." The reviewer also praises the art, saying Le Nguyen's "clever use of color smooths the way for the sophisticated embedding of stories within a story", the technique which is used to highlight "the complex dynamics between first-generation and second-generation family members." Terry Hong, reviewing for The Booklist, called it a "homage to the infinite power of storytelling." A review published on Good Comics for Kidscalled the story "impeccable" and praised Nguyen's art style.

In a review for The Horn Book Magazine, Jerry Dear calls The Magic Fish an "imaginative graphic novel", and noted Nguyen's use of "[p]astel shades of red, brown, and purple" to change between the various stories being told in parallel. Publishers Weekly also praised the author's use of different colors to signify a different layer of reality, and ended the review by saying "Nguyen’s poignant debut captures the perspectives of, and essence of the bond between, a parent and child". The New York Times published a review by Jen Wang, in which she calls Nguyen "a gifted storyteller". Wang proceeds to explain how the author uses the medium of graphic novels and fairy tales to emphasize different emotions, such as "romance or melancholy", and cultures, and finalizes her review by calling the novel "especially inventive."

Awards 
Nguyen was nominated for an Eisner Award in the Best Writer/Artist category for his work in The Magic Fish and won the 2021 Harvey Award for Book of the Year. Additionally, the novel was shortlisted for the Best Comic/Graphic Novel category of the British Fantasy Awards, the GLAAD Media Award for Outstanding Comic Book and the 33rd Lambda Literary Awards for Young Adult Literature.

References 

2020 graphic novels
2020s LGBT novels
American autobiographical novels
Gay male teen fiction
Harvey Award winners
LGBT-related graphic novels
Random House books
Vietnamese American